Žabeň is a municipality and village in Frýdek-Místek District in the Moravian-Silesian Region of the Czech Republic. It has about 900 inhabitants.

Etymology
The name is derived from the Czech word žába, which means "frog". It refers to their large population in the ponds and wetlands that used to be here.

History
The first written mention of Žabeň is from 1460.

References

External links

Villages in Frýdek-Místek District